Pedaran-e Sofla (also Romanized as Pedarān-e Soflá; also known as Kalāteh-ye Peydarān-e Pā’īn, Kalateh-i-Pidarān, Kalāteh-ye Pedarān-e Pā’īn, and Pedarān) is a village in Mud Rural District, Mud District, Sarbisheh County, South Khorasan Province, Iran. At the 2006 census, its population was 29, in 7 families.

References 

Populated places in Sarbisheh County